Petr Drobisz (born 14 July 1976 is a Czech former professional football player who played as a goalkeeper; he last played for 1. SC Znojmo in the Czech Gambrinus Liga. Drobisz was suspended as part of an enquiry into corruption allegations, as announced by the Czech Football Association on 9 June 2011.  This was later confirmed on 18 August 2011 as an 18-month suspension.

After his ban had ended in February 2013, he signed with the newly promoted Znojmo for the 2013–14 season.

References

External links
 
 Guardian Football

Czech footballers
Czech First League players
Association football goalkeepers
1. FC Slovácko players
SK Sigma Olomouc players
FK Jablonec players
Sportspeople from Třinec
1976 births
Living people